is a railway station located in Kitamachi, Wassamu, Kamikawa District, Hokkaidō, Japan, and is operated by the Hokkaido Railway Company.

Lines Serviced
JR Hokkaidō
Sōya Main Line

Adjacent stations

External links

Railway stations in Hokkaido Prefecture
Railway stations in Japan opened in 1899